The Siouxsie and the Banshees Peel sessions are a series of sessions recorded by English post-punk band Siouxsie and the Banshees for John Peel's radio show on BBC Radio 1 in November 1977 and February 1978. Both sessions were remastered to be included on the Voices on the Air: The Peel Sessions CD compilation.

Releases

The Peel Sessions EP (1987) 

The first EP, The Peel Sessions, was released in 1987 by record label Strange Fruit. It features recordings made for John Peel's show broadcast on 5 December 1977, and was recorded at the BBC Studios in Maida Vale, London, England on 29 November 1977. None of the songs had been released prior to the broadcast.

The EP entered on the UK Singles Chart, peaking at number 95.

Track listing

The Peel Sessions The Second Session EP (1989) 

The second EP, also titled The Peel Sessions, was released in 1988 by Strange Fruit. It features the recordings made for John Peel's show broadcast on 23 February 1978, and was recorded at the BBC Studios in Maida Vale, London, England on 6 February 1978. None of the songs had been released prior to the broadcast. The version of "Hong Kong Garden" is the only early studio recording on which the oriental hook is played on glockenspiel. The session also includes a version of "Overground" featuring a Hammond organ motif.

Track listing

References 

1988 EPs
Siouxsie and the Banshees EPs
Siouxsie and the Banshees